TWP or Twp may refer to:

Arts and media
 Truth & Wisdom Press, an educational publisher
 The Washington Post, a daily newspaper
 The Women's Philharmonic, an orchestra

Political parties
 Traditionalist Worker Party, United States
 True Whig Party, Liberia
 The Wikileaks Party, Australia

Other uses
 Ere language, an Austronesian language  (ISO 639-3 code: twp)
 Thomas Weisel Partners, an American investment bank
 Township (United States), a type of administrative area (abbreviated Twp.)